Archibald Drummond (2 April 1915 – 16 September 1990) was a Scotland international rugby union player. He played as a wing.

Rugby Union career

Amateur career

Drummond played for Kelvinside Academicals.

Provincial career

Drummond was capped for Glasgow District. He shone in the inter-city match against Edinburgh District on 4 December 1937. He scored 1 try, 2 conversions and 3 penalties in the match, helping Glasgow to an emphatic 29 - 6 victory.

He was supposed to play for the Scotland Probables in the first trial match of season 1937-38. The match due on 18 December 1937 was called off due to frost despite the contingency of straw being placed on The Greenyards pitch at Melrose. He did however turn out for the Scotland Probables side for the second and final trial match of that season, on 15 January 1938.

International career

Drummond was capped by Scotland twice. Both caps came in 1938.

References

1915 births
1990 deaths
Glasgow District (rugby union) players
Kelvinside Academicals RFC players
Rugby union players from Glasgow
Scotland international rugby union players
Scotland Probables players
Scottish rugby union players
Rugby union wings